The 2020 United States Senate election in Louisiana was held on November 3, 2020, to elect a member of the United States Senate to represent the State of Louisiana, concurrently with the 2020 U.S. presidential election, as well as other elections to the United States Senate, elections to the United States House of Representatives and various state and local elections. A blanket primary was held on November 3, 2020; if no candidate had won a majority of the vote in the blanket primary, then a runoff election would have been held on December 5.

Candidates

Republican Party

Declared
Bill Cassidy, incumbent U.S. Senator
Dustin Murphy, welder

Democratic Party
Though there were multiple Democratic candidates, the one with the most institutional support was Shreveport Mayor Adrian Perkins, who had the endorsements of the Louisiana Democratic Party and the Democratic Senatorial Campaign Committee and would end up receiving the nomination.

Declared
Derrick Edwards, perennial candidate
Drew Knight
Adrian Perkins, mayor of Shreveport
Antoine Pierce, community activist
Peter Wenstrup, teacher

Withdrew 
Dartanyon Williams, businessman and author (running for Louisiana's 6th congressional district)

Declined
Mary Landrieu, former U.S. Senator
Mitch Landrieu, former mayor of New Orleans

Endorsements

Libertarian Party

Declared
Aaron Sigler, neurosurgeon

Independents

Declared
Beryl Billiot, businessman
John Paul Bourgeois
Reno Jean Daret III
Alexander "Xan" John, businessman and law student
Jamar "Doc" Montgomery, attorney

Withdrew
Gregory Fitch

General election

Predictions

Polling

Head to head matchups 
Bill Cassidy vs. Adrian Perkins

Bill Cassidy vs. generic opponent

Generic Republican vs. generic Democrat

Results

Notes

Partisan clients

References

External links
 
 
  (State affiliate of the U.S. League of Women Voters)
 
 . (Guidance to help voters get to the polls; addresses transport, childcare, work, information challenges)

Official campaign websites
 Beryl Biliot (I) for Senate
 John Paul Bourgeois (I) for Senate
 Bill Cassidy (R) for Senate
 Derrick Edwards (D) for Senate
 Aaron Sigler (L) for Senate
 Drew Knight (D) for Senate 
 Jamar "Doc" Montgomery (I) for Senate
 Dustin Murphy (R) for Senate
 Adrian Perkins (D) for Senate
 Antoine Pierce (D) for Senate 
 Peter Wenstrup (D) for Senate

2020
Louisiana
United States Senate